Friends for Lesbian, Gay, Bisexual, Transgender, and Queer Concerns (FLGBTQC) is a faith community within the Religious Society of Friends.

Purpose
From a minute approved in 1999, FLGBTQC states:

FLGBTQC publishes a semi-annual newsletter, which is received by 1,500 individuals and Quaker Meetings worldwide.

The group maintains a collection of Marriage Minutes by Quaker Meetings regarding same-sex marriage.  FLGBTQC has also sponsored the publication of Each of Us Inevitable,, a collection of talks about coming to terms with one's identity and direction.

Membership

FLGBTQC holds twice-yearly Gatherings, one in February and one in July at the Friends General Conference Annual Gathering of Friends. Most participants live in the United States, which is where all of the February Gatherings (and all but one of the July ones) have been held for over twenty-five years.

History

FLGBTQC's origin comes from groups founded in the 1970s, when gay and lesbian Friends were first becoming visible in North American Quakerism.  Initially, these Friends founded a group called Friends Committee for Concern.  The group has since changed its name three times: first, to "Friends Committee on Gay Concerns" (FCGC), then to "Friends for Lesbian and Gay Concerns" (FLGC), and most recently, to "Friends for Lesbian, Gay, Bisexual, Transgender, and Queer Concerns" (FLGBTQC).  This most recent name change occurred at the Gathering in February 2003, at Ghost Ranch, in New Mexico.

See also

LGBT-welcoming church programs

References

External links
Friends for Lesbian, Gay, Bisexual, Transgender, and Queer Concerns
Bruce Grimes and Geoffrey Kaiser journal collection at Friends Historical Library of Swarthmore College
Friends for Lesbian, Gay, Bisexual, Transgender, and Queer Concerns records held by Friends Historical Library of Swarthmore College

LGBT Christian organizations
Quaker organizations based in the United States
International LGBT organizations